The Mercury Cyclone Spoiler II is a muscle car that was produced by Mercury in early 1969.  The Mercury Cyclone Spoiler II was a special, more aerodynamic version of the Mercury Cyclone.  It was produced specifically to make Mercury even more competitive in NASCAR stock car racing, and was sold to the public only because homologation rules required a minimum number of cars (500 in 1969) be produced and made available for sale to the public. All production examples were constructed during the first few weeks of 1969.

Production
The Mercury Cyclone Spoiler II was built in only two trim packages:  The Cale Yarborough Special - a white car with red interior and exterior trim, and the Dan Gurney Special - a white car with blue interior and trim.

A largely equivalent vehicle was also produced under the Ford marque as the Ford Torino Talladega.

The 1969 Mercury Cyclone Spoiler II was based on the Mercury Cyclone "Sportsroof" (Ford's trade name for a fastback) 2-door hardtop. To make the car more aerodynamic at high speeds, a sleeker front section was added. Regular production Mercury Cyclones had a then-fashionable inset grille and headlights, which fared poorly in the wind tunnel. The Mercury Cyclone Spoiler II had this nose replaced with one that extended the car's length by about six inches, with a flush-mounted grille from a Ford Cobra, identical to the grill used on the Ford Torino Talladega giving it a much more aerodynamic front end. The close-fitting bumper was actually a rear bumper from a 1969 Ford Fairlane that had been cut, narrowed, V'ed in the center, and filled on the ends to create a crude air dam, further improving the aerodynamics of the car at high speeds. In a well kept, secret design move, the rocker panels were reshaped and rolled to allow Mercury teams to run their racing cars about an inch closer to the ground while staying within NASCAR rules; this also greatly enhanced the top speed of the car by lowering its center of gravity, and further reducing its wind resistance.  All production (homologation) models of the Mercury Cyclone Spoiler II were equipped with a 351 Windsor engine, automatic on the column, and front bench seat.

Racing
Racing versions of the car were initially fitted with the Ford FE 427 side oiler engine that had been Ford's main racing engine since 1963.  Later in the season, the Boss 429 engine was used by many of the teams, after it had finally been declared "officially homologated" by NASCAR president, Bill France. The Boss 429 engine was homologated in the 1969 Ford Mustang Boss 429. In a very unusual move, Ford homologated the engine separately from the car in which it was to race.  Many experts think this may have been done in order to get the bodywork of the Mercury Cyclone Spoiler II officially homologated at the beginning of the 1969 race season, as the Boss 429 was not yet in production in sufficient numbers to homologate it.

A prototype of the Cyclone Spoiler II had exposed headlights where the front nose resembled the one based on the Datsun 240Z. 

The Mercury Cyclone Spoiler II was very successful on the racing circuit: winning 8 Grand National races during the 1969 and 1970 NASCAR seasons - matching the total number of wins recorded by the 1970 Plymouth Superbird.

One important footnote:  1969 was Ford's last year of factory involvement, and/or support, in racing of any kind for several years.  Following Congressional hearings in which they were questioned about the R&D costs of racing vs. improving fuel economy and safety, Ford completely abandoned all of their racing programs, starting with the 1970 season.  Subsequently, most of the NASCAR and ARCA race teams, running Mercurys, continued to run their 1969 Mercury Cyclone Spoiler IIs in 1970 without any factory support, when it became apparent that their Spoiler IIs were aerodynamically superior to the 1970 Mercurys that Ford intended to be their replacement.  After the 1970 season, NASCAR effectively banned the "aero cars", by restricting all five of the limited aero "production" cars to having to compete with engines no larger than 305 cubic inches of displacement (vs. the 426, 427, & 429 inches that the other cars could run), and the competitive history of the Mercury Cyclone Spoiler II (and its fellow aerowarrior rivals) was essentially over.

Collectability
Today, a Mercury Cyclone Spoiler II is a very collectible car.  It was a special purpose built vehicle (some have even called it a "showroom race car") with a very strong racing history, that achieved great success during the Aero Wars.  Those examples that still exist today, do so in very limited numbers. For some reason, their values have not risen nearly as high as the Mopar "aero cars", in spite of their rarity and their great track successes during the pinnacle of stock car racing (the aero wars years).  Some experts have assumed that this was due to the sheer outrageousness of the Dodge Charger Daytona and the Plymouth Superbird, with their huge rear wings; as the MOPAR winged cars' prices have eclipsed the far more subtle bodywork of the Mercury Cyclone Spoiler II.  Regardless, most experts consider the Mercury Cyclone Spoiler IIs (and the Ford Torino Talladegas) to be very undervalued by comparison; but, in 1969 (and over the two years of the Aero Wars) Mercury's Cyclone Spoiler IIs and Ford's Talladegas owned the high banks of NASCAR and ARCA.

Rumors
Until very recently (2010), very little had been written and documented about these rare cars; however, there is now a website that is dedicated to the Talladega and Spoiler cars produced by Ford and Mercury during 1969 as they fired powerful shots during the aerowars. Also, according to rumor from many sources (a sample of which also appears on the Talladega/Spoiler Registry, and is quoted here), Ford's Mercury Division may not have actually built 500 Spoiler IIs.

"NASCAR mandated that at least 500 of these hand built extended nose cars had to be manufactured. According to some rumors Mercury built only 351 out of a reported 503 units. How could they have done this? As the story goes they built 351 extended “D” nosed cars; parked them in the front and on the edges of a parking lot; took 152 regular “W” nosed Cyclone Spoilers and parked them in the middle of all the Spoiler IIs in the parking lot. When NASCAR counted the cars they just never looked closely enough at the cars in the rear! However, it must be known that the Marti Report states that 503 Spoiler IIs were manufactured."

The legend goes:  When NASCAR indicated they would be coming to count cars, Mercury was way behind in production.  As a last-ditch, "What do we do now?" solution, someone mandated that 152 regular ("W" nose Mercury Cyclones) be painted up in Spoiler colors and trim.  If you examine the handful of Mercury Spoilers (the "W" nose models), you will find that they represent quite a cross section of engine and interior options.  Some are automatics, some are stick shifts, some are big blocks, some are small blocks, some have front bench seats, and some have front bucket seats. There are less than a dozen known Big Block Cyclones left. The lowest known example is vin# 9xxxxx49176 a 390 Improved Performance "S" code car that is also believed to be the only Factory A/C car. This gives a great deal of credibility to this particular rumor.

See also 

 List of Ford vehicles

References

External links 
 Talladega page at fordfairlane.com
 Aero Warriors site about the "aero cars"; concentrates on the Mopar cars, but includes much about the racing history of all the cars.
 FordFastback.com  This site is dedicated to Ford fastbacks centering on Talladegas and Galaxies with comparative anatomy.
 What Really Happened During the Aerowars? This site is dedicated to the Aero Wars and what occurred during that time.
 Talladega and Spoiler Registry This site is dedicated to information about Talladegas and Spoilers

Cyclone Spoiler II
Muscle cars

ja:フォード・トリノ・タラデガ